Slaves to the Underground is a 1997 drama film directed by Kristine Peterson and starring Molly Gross, Jason Bortz, and Marisa Ryan.

Premise
In Seattle's mid-1990s grunge scene, a female rock group named No Exits is struggling to gain attention. Guitarist Shelly (Molly Gross) threatens the band's future by jumping back and forth between a lesbian relationship with the band's singer Suzy (Marisa Ryan) and a heterosexual relationship with her ex-boyfriend Jimmy (Jason Bortz).

Reception
The New York Times praised the film's spontaneous performances.

References

External links

1997 films
1997 drama films
Lesbian-related films
Films set in the 1990s
Films set in Seattle
American independent films
American LGBT-related films
Films about music and musicians
American drama films
LGBT-related drama films
1997 independent films
1997 LGBT-related films
1990s English-language films
Films directed by Kristine Peterson
1990s American films